King of Jeans is a 2009 album by noise rock/hardcore punk band Pissed Jeans.  It is their second album for Sub Pop Records, and their first album working with English producer Alex Newport.  Like most of the band's releases, the album features banal lyrics and atonal and abrasive guitar rock. It has been well received by critics.

Track listing

 False Jesii Part 2 - 2:34
 Half Idiot - 2:33
 Dream Smotherer - 4:21
 Pleasure Race - 2:11
 She Is Science Fiction - 2:09
 Request for Masseuse - 2:46
 Human Upskirt - 2:11
 Lip Ring - 3:03
 Spent - 7:32
 R-Rated Movie - 3:01
 Dominate Yourself - 3:14
 Goodbye (Hair) - 4:00

References

2009 albums
Sub Pop albums
Pissed Jeans albums
Albums produced by Alex Newport